Five ships of the Royal Navy have borne the name HMS Trusty:

  was a 50-gun fourth-rate launched in 1782, used as a troopship from 1799 and a prison ship from 1809, and broken up in 1815. Because Trusty served in the navy's Egyptian campaign (8 March to 2 September 1801), her officers and crew qualified for the clasp "Egypt" to the Naval General Service Medal, which the Admiralty issued in 1847 to all surviving claimants.
  was an  ironclad floating battery launched in 1855 and broken up in 1864
  was a tugboat launched in 1866, renamed in 1917 as HMS Trustful and broken up in 1920
  was an  launched in 1918 and broken up in 1936
  was a T-class submarine launched in 1941 and broken up in 1947

Sources

References

Royal Navy ship names